West Coast is a Canadian variety show television series which debuted on the CTV television network in 1961.

The show was produced at the studios of CHAN-TV in Vancouver, British Columbia and mixed studio segments with filmed location footage from around British Columbia. Airing at 7:30-8:00 PM on Friday nights, it was cancelled after one season due to high costs and poor viewership. Rai Purdy was producer.

External links
 West Coast

1961 Canadian television series debuts
1962 Canadian television series endings
1960s Canadian variety television series
CTV Television Network original programming
Television shows filmed in Vancouver